Somewhere Before is a live album by pianist Keith Jarrett recorded on August 30 and 31, 1968, at Shelly's Manne-Hole in Hollywood, California with his first trio, composed of Charlie Haden (bass) and Paul Motian (drums).

Reception 
The AllMusic review by Richard S. Ginell awarded the album 4 stars, stating, "As an example of early, unfocused Jarrett, this is fascinating material.". The authors of the Penguin Guide to Jazz Recordings commented: "Heavily rock-influenced and reminiscent of the methodology of the Charles Lloyd Quartet and the Miles Davis group, of which Jarrett was still a member... it has a freshness of approach that Jarrett quickly lost and was slow to regain." Pianist / composer Ethan Iverson singled out "My Back Pages" for praise, stating: "Dylan recorded it as a waltz, but this backbeat 4/4 rendition emulates the hit version by The Byrds. Jarrett's control of light and shade, both in the melody and the accompaniment, gives his pianism a kind of glamour that can reach out and touch listeners from any background."

Track listing 
All compositions by Keith Jarrett except as indicated

 "My Back Pages" (Bob Dylan) - 5:24
 "Pretty Ballad" - 3:30
 "Moving Soon" - 4:24
 "Somewhere Before" - 6:50
 "New Rag" - 5:40
 "A Moment for Tears" - 3:07
 "Pouts' Over" (And the Day's Not Through) - 4:35
 "Dedicated to You" (Sammy Cahn, Saul Chaplin, Hy Zaret) - 5:00
 "Old Rag" - 2:37

Personnel
Keith Jarrett - piano
Charlie Haden - double-bass
Paul Motian - drums

References 

Keith Jarrett live albums
1969 live albums
Atlantic Records live albums
Albums produced by George Avakian
Albums recorded at Shelly's Manne-Hole
Vortex Records live albums